Shawnisha Hector is an Antiguan cricketer who plays for Leeward Islands, Trinbago Knight Riders and the West Indies. In October 2019, she was named in the West Indies' squad for their series against India. She became the first Antiguan female cricketer to be selected for the West Indies team. She made her Women's One Day International (WODI) debut for the West Indies against India on 1 November 2019. In May 2021, Hector was awarded with a central contract from Cricket West Indies.

References

External links

Living people
Year of birth missing (living people)
Place of birth missing (living people)
Antigua and Barbuda women cricketers
West Indian women cricketers
West Indies women One Day International cricketers
Leeward Islands women cricketers
Trinbago Knight Riders (WCPL) cricketers